The Arab Labor Organization (ALO) is the first Specialized Arab Organization concerned with labor affairs and employment issues on National Level. It was established in 12/01/1965, as one of the specialized organizations affiliated with the League of Arab States. ALO is believing in the importance of concerted tripartite in the Arab world, as a need and a core pillar for Arab unity and the recognition that cooperation in the field of employment is the best guarantee for the Arab human rights in decent life, founded on social justice, and the process of effective cooperation for developing Arab society on solid and sound foundations, therefore ALO has a unique tripartite structure in the Arab world gives an opportunity to (workers , employers and governments of 21 Arab countries) to freely debate, elaborate and shape labor standards, policies and programs.

History 
On the 12th of January 1965, the first Conference of Arab Ministers of Labor, held in Baghdad, approved the Arab Labor Charter and the draft Constitution of the Arab Labor Organization. On the 8th of January 1970, the fifth Conference of Arab Labor Ministers, in Cairo, decided to announce the establishment of the Arab Labor Organization after the completion of the necessary number of ratifications of Member States on the Arab Labor Charter and the Constitution of the Organization. The resolution to declare the organization was in response to the national trend, looking forward to achieve unity in various fields.

Membership
ALO has 21 Arab State Members:

Objectives
Arab Labor Organization aims to achieve the following :

 Coordinating efforts in work and workers fields at the Arab and international levels.
 Developing and maintaining the trade union rights and freedom of association.
 Providing technical assistance in all fields of labor to the tripartite in the Member States.
 Developing labor legislation in the Member States and working on standardization.
 Improving work conditions in the Member States.
 Developing Arab human resources to take advantage of its full capacities in economic and social development.
 Developing the Arab workforce and raising productivity efficiency.
 Preparing a guide, and laying the foundations for occupational classification and characterization.
 Translating, into Arabic, the labor and vocational training terms.

Arab Labor standards
Since 1966, Arab Labor Organization has maintained and developed a system of Arab labor standards aimed at promoting opportunities for workers to obtain decent and productive work, in conditions of equity, security, dignity, safe and healthy. These standards have become a comprehensive system of instruments on work policy, designed to address most sorts of problems in their application at the national level. Arab labor standards are legal instruments drawn up by the ALO's constituents (governments, employers and workers) and setting out basic principles and rights at work. They are either conventions, which are legally binding the member states who ratified them, or recommendations, which serve as non-binding guidelines.

Conventions and Recommendations
ALO Issued (19) Conventions and (9) recommendations, which organized all aspects of the legal instruments relating to work, to ensure workers' rights and regulate the relationship between workers and employers, to define the responsibilities and duties of tripartite. By its Conventions and Recommendations, ALO is developing and promoting national labor legislation, to achieve symmetry between them, believing that national labor inspection is the proper way to guarantee the implementation of the legislation’s provisions.

Conventions

Recommendations

Constitutional bodies

1- Arab Labor Conference (The General Conference)

It is the Supreme authority of the organization. ALO organizes once a year the Arab Labor Conference to set the broad policies of the ALO, including conventions and recommendations. The conference makes decisions about the ALO's general policy, work plan and budget and also elects the Board of Directors and Director General. Each Member State is represented by a delegation: two government delegates, an employer delegate, a worker delegate and their respective advisers. International and regional organizations, also attend but as observers.

2- Board of Directors
ALO has a tripartite governing structure that brings together governments, employers, and workers of 21 member States. The very structure of ALO, where workers and employers together have an equal voice with governments in its deliberations, ensures that the views of the social partners are closely reflected in ALO labor standards, policies and plans. It meets twice a year, in March and October. It takes decisions on the agenda of the Arab Labor Conference, adopts the draft Plan and Budget of the Organization for submission to the Arab labor Conference, and supervises the work of ALO.

This Board of Directors is composed of 8 titular members (4 Governments, 2 Employers and 2 Workers) and 3 deputy members (one represents each group).

The Government, Employers and Workers seats are elected by the General Conference every two years (the last elections were held in April 2018).

3- Arab Labor Office 
The Arab Labor Office is the permanent secretariat of the Arab Labor Organization. It is located in Cairo – Egypt, the headquarters state, according to the constitution. It is headed by the Director General whose one of his responsibilities is to implement the resolutions of the General Conference and the Board of Directors.

Affiliates

 Arab Institute for Workers Education & Labor Researches in Algeria
 Arab Center for Social Insurance in Sudan
 Arab Institute for Occupational Health & Safety in Syria
 Arab Center for Human Resource Development in Libya
 Arab Center for Labor Administration & Employment in Tunisia
 ALO Permanent Mission in Geneva

Director General

References

External links 

 ALO Official website
 YouTube Official Channel 
 Flickr Official Page

Organizations established in 1965
Non-profit organisations based in Egypt
Arab organizations